Center is a district and the central neighborhood of the city of Celje in central-eastern Slovenia.

Geography of Celje
Districts of the City Municipality of Celje